Columbia Transportation is a fare-free bus network providing service to Columbia University campuses. It is operated by Academy Bus Lines and Luxury Transportation to serve employees and students. The buses are open to all Columbia faculty, students, Dodge Fitness Center members, and anyone else who holds a Columbia ID card.

Routes

Active Routes
Routes colored yellow are operated by Luxury Transportation.The Bakers Field Shuttle uses Columbia Athletics-branded Academy buses.

Former Routes

Columbia Commuter Shuttles 
In August 2020, Columbia announced that they would start commuter shuttle service in the Fall 2020 semester. These buses would function as express buses, linking areas that do not have direct connections to Columbia to each campus. The contractor for these routes is Academy Bus Lines, using coach buses. The original system included the Yankee Stadium Commuter Route, which functioned essentially as a park and ride route, however this was discontinued due to extremely low ridership. The buses assigned to the Yankee Stadium route were reassigned to the East Manhattan Route. The Queens-Riverdale Commuter Route, however still serves the Southfield Commuter Lot at Citi Field park and ride in Queens. The Commuter Shuttle Service ended on December 30, 2021.

Evening Shuttle 
On June 9, 2020, Columbia announced that the Evening Shuttle service, previously provided by the Columbia Public Safety department, would restart with an on-demand service model. Users would order cars from the ridesharing service Via, and provided the rides were within the coverage area, Columbia Transportation would reimburse. This program would operate 7 days a week, from 6 pm to 3 am in the summer, and 4 pm to 3 am in the winter. In January 2022, Service was expanded eastwards, covering much of Central Harlem. In June 2022, the service was changed to operate from 8 pm to 3 am. The service was estimated to have 162,000 riders during the 2021-2022 academic year. On , the hours were changed again. Rides would operate from 6 to 8 pm, only from street corner to street corner, and past 8 pm on a door-to-door basis, where rides are offered to anywhere in the zone.

Fleet

Active

Intercampus, Lamont, Manhattanville, and Fort Lee Shuttles

Bakers Field Shuttle

Arbor Shuttle

Retired

References

Columbia University
Bus transportation in New York City
Bus transportation in New Jersey
Transportation in Bergen County, New Jersey
Bus routes in Manhattan
University and college bus systems